Krader can refer to:
Krader, a character from the Mixels franchise
Lawrence Krader, an important American socialist anthropologist and ethnologist
Sherman Krader, a character from the movie Ernest Goes to Camp